Psidium guajava, the common guava, yellow guava, lemon guava, or apple guava is an evergreen shrub or small tree native to the Caribbean, Central America and South America. It is easily pollinated by insects; when cultivated, it is pollinated mainly by the common honey bee, Apis mellifera.

Overview

Widely cultivated in tropical and subtropical regions around the world, guava fruits can range in size from as small as an apricot to as large as a grapefruit. Various cultivars have white, pink, or red flesh; a few varieties feature red (instead of green or yellow) skin.

When cultivated from seed, guavas are notable for their extremely slow growth rate for several months, before a very rapid acceleration in growth rate takes over. From seed, common guavas may bloom and set fruit in as few as two years or as many as eight. Cuttings, grafting, and air layering are more commonly used as a propagation method in commercial groves. Highly adaptable, guavas can be easily grown as container plants in temperate regions, though their ability to bloom and set fruit is somewhat less predictable. In some tropical locations, guavas can become invasive. It has become a major problem in the Galápagos Islands.

The plant is used in many different shampoo products for its scent. It is also becoming a popular bonsai species and is currently quite popular in India and Eastern Asia.

Chemistry 
The leaves of P. guajava contain the flavonol morin, morin-3-O-lyxoside, morin-3-O-arabinoside, quercetin and quercetin-3-O-arabinoside.

Wood 
Guava wood from Hawaii is commonly used for the smoking of meat. The wood is resistant to insect and fungal attack.

Traditional medicine 
Psidium guajava has been used in traditional medicine by many cultures throughout Central America, the Caribbean, Africa, and Asia. It is used for inflammation, diabetes, hypertension, caries, wounds, pain relief, fever, diarrhea, rheumatism, lung diseases, and ulcers.

Use as food and feed

Guava is an edible fruit, and can be eaten raw or cooked. The processing of the fruits yields by-products that can be fed to livestock. The leaves can also be used as fodder.

References

External links

guajava
Flora of Mexico
Flora of South America
Plants described in 1753
Taxa named by Carl Linnaeus